The Ashley Youth Detention Centre is a Youth detention centre outside Deloraine, Tasmania, Australia. It is the only such centre in Tasmania and has a capacity of 51 beds for 10 to 18 year old offenders.

The site was originally an experimental agricultural school, similar to the one at nearby Hagley, that opened in 1914 as the State Farm. The experiment was not successful and the school closed. The site was subdivided in 1922 and  set aside for a boy's home. The original 1913 building was retained for accommodation of the boys, and cottages kept for staff. From 1869 youth offenders had been housed in the Boys' Training School in Hobart. In 1922 the Deloraine school site was reopened as the Ashley Home for Boys, taking over the Hobart facility's function. it was first opened with a focus on farm work as a reform method. It has remained as a youth detention centre since, and became known as the Ashley Youth Detention Centre in 2000.

In September 2021, it was announced that Ashley Youth Detention Centre would close within 3 years, and be replaced by 2 new facilities.

In 2022, a Tasmanian Government inquiry revealed that 55 workers at Ashley Youth Detention Centre had been accused of child sex abuse by former child detainees. One former worker was accused of abusing 11 children over the course of 3 decades. Another former staff member was accused of using sexual violence and intimidation, including forced masturbation, against 26 former child detainees. The alleged crimes span from recent years back to the 1970s.

References

Prisons in Tasmania
Juvenile detention centres in Australia